The 2021 Villanova Wildcats football team represented Villanova University in the 2021 NCAA Division I FCS football season. They were led by fifth-year head coach Mark Ferrante and played their home games at Villanova Stadium. They competed as a member of the Colonial Athletic Association.

Previous season

Due to the COVID-19 pandemic, the 2020 Villanova Wildcats football season was moved to the spring of 2021. The team finished with a 2–2 record with an additional 2 games cancelled (ruled no contest) due to pandemic.

Schedule

References

Villanova
Villanova Wildcats football seasons
Colonial Athletic Association football champion seasons
2021 NCAA Division I FCS playoff participants
Villanova Wildcats football